Jeremiah Timbut Useni (born 16 February 1943) is a retired Nigerian army lieutenant general, who served as minister responsible for the administration of the Federal Capital Territory, Abuja under the Sani Abacha military junta. He served Nigeria in various capacities such as Minister for Transport and Quarter-Master General of the Nigeria Army. Useni also served as Deputy Chairman of one of the significant parties in Nigeria, the All Nigeria Peoples Party. He was elected Senator for the Plateau South constituency of Plateau State, Nigeria in the March 2015 national elections. Useni was running on the People's Democratic Party (PDP) platform.

Military service 
Useni came to national limelight in Nigeria when he was appointed Military Governor of Nigeria's defunct Bendel State in January 1984. 
In 1998, Useni then minister for the capital territory of Abuja, was rumored as a successor to General Sani Abacha.
Useni states that the decision to appoint Abdulsalami Abubakar instead was based on protocol.
Ten years later, Useni insisted Abacha died a natural death, contrary to rumors that he died after eating a poisoned apple.

Speaking in April 2008, the Minister of the Federal Capital Territory, Aliyu Modibbo Umar, blamed problems with the Abuja Master Plan on the administration of Useni as a minister under the Abacha military government.

Political career 
In August 2001, he was appointed head of a delegation from the Arewa Consultative Forum to meet and discuss common goals with Northern state governors and other leaders.
In 2003, he was Deputy National Chairman, North for the All Nigeria Peoples Party (ANPP).
In November 2004, he was locked in an internal ANPP struggle with Chief Donald Etiebet, the National Chairman.

In May 2006, he left the ANPP to become chairman of a new party, the Democratic People's Party, taking with him other members of the progressive wing of the ANPP.
However, he was suspended indefinitely in December 2008, for saying the death of Ken Saro-Wiwa was a national sacrifice.
He was succeeded by Biodun Ogunbiyi, who criticized Useni's poor leadership, resulting in failure to win any seats in the Senate or House of Representatives in the April 2007 elections.
Useni ran for election as Senator for Plateau South in April 2011 on the DPP platform, but was defeated by Victor Lar of the PDP. He later on ran for  election as Senator for Plateau South In 2015 under the People's Democratic Party which he won.

Governorship run 
In October 2018, Jeremiah Useni won the party primaries in the PDP to run for Office Of The Governor Of Plateau state under the platform of the People's Democratic Party. He lost in the general election to incumbent Simon Lalong who polled 595, 582 votes to Useni's 546, 813. Useni challenged  the election of Simon Lalong at the plateau State Governorship Election Petition Tribunal on the ground that Lalong was ineligible to assume the position of Governor, having submitted a different certificate to the electoral umpire (INEC) bearing different name to that of the present Governor of Plateau State, Simon Bako Lalong.

The three panel of justices Tribunal led by Justice Halima Salami struck out Useni's petition affirming the election of Lalong for lack of substantial evidence to prove the discrepancy of names in the certificate Lalong submitted to INEC. Useni appealed the judgement of the tribunal at both Appeal Court and the Supreme Court but lost. The disappointing judgment from the courts ended his 2019 ambition to rule Plateau State.

References

1943 births
Living people
All Nigeria Peoples Party politicians
Democratic People's Party (Nigeria) politicians
Governors of Bendel State
Ministers of the Federal Capital Territory (Nigeria)
Federal ministers of Nigeria
Nigerian Military School alumni
Members of the Senate (Nigeria)
Peoples Democratic Party (Nigeria) politicians
Plateau State